Lan Yu-chieh (born 16 November 2000) is a Taiwanese footballer who plays as a midfielder for Taiwan Mulan Football League club Kaohsiung Sunny Bank and the Chinese Taipei women's national team.

References

2000 births
Living people
Women's association football midfielders
Taiwanese women's footballers
Footballers from Kaohsiung
Chinese Taipei women's international footballers